Hinchinbrook Shire Library is a public library servicing the Hinchinbrook Shire, Queensland, Australia.  It is located at 73-75 McIllwraith Street in the town of Ingham.

History 
The current Hinchinbrook Shire Library opened in 2011 in Ingham.

References

External links 
 

Libraries in Queensland
Ingham, Queensland